In chemical kinetics, the entropy of activation of a reaction is one of the two parameters (along with the enthalpy of activation) which are typically obtained from the temperature dependence of a reaction rate constant, when these data are analyzed using the Eyring equation of the transition state theory. The standard entropy of activation is symbolized  and equals the change in entropy when the reactants change from their initial state to the activated complex or transition state ( = change,  = entropy,  = activation). It determines the preexponential factor  of the Arrhenius equation for temperature dependence of reaction rates. The relationship depends on the molecularity of the reaction: for reactions in solution and unimolecular gas reactions  , while for bimolecular gas reactions . In these equations  is the base of natural logarithms,  is the Planck constant,  is the Boltzmann constant and  the absolute temperature. ' is the ideal gas constant in units of (bar·L)/(mol·K). The factor is needed because of the pressure dependence of the reaction rate.  (bar·L)/(mol·K).

The value of  provides clues about the molecularity of the rate determining step in a reaction, i.e. the number of molecules that enter this step.  Positive values suggest that entropy increases upon achieving the transition state, which often indicates a dissociative mechanism in which the activated complex is loosely bound and about to dissociate. Negative values for  indicate that entropy decreases on forming the transition state, which often indicates an associative mechanism in which two reaction partners form a single activated complex.

References

Chemical kinetics